The Lizard, Op. 8, is an incidental music for orchestra by Jean Sibelius for a play of that name by Mikael Lybeck (1864-1925). He supplied music for two scenes: Act II Scene 1 and Act II Scene 3. Sibelius completed it in 1909 and conducted the first performance at Helsinki's Swedish Theatre on 6 April 1910 . Although it is rarely played, Sibelius told his friend and patron Axel Carpelan that it was "one of the most exquisite works that I have written".

The work derives from the "crisis" period between 1908 and 1912. It is scored for solo violin and string ensemble (with no more than 9 players according to the composer's own notes) and a typical performance lasts 17 minutes.

The principal character in the play, Count Alban, is engaged to Elisiv, who represents everything that is pure. But, Adla —word that resembles to Ödlan or lizard— symbolises evil and arouses both fear and passion in Alban. Elisiv and Adla both struggle to keep Alban's soul on their side. Elisiv trips, falls, and perishes in the struggle, but in revenge, Alban kills the evil that exists within himself - i.e. Adla.

References 

Incidental music by Jean Sibelius
1909 compositions